Monochaetia coryli is a species of fungus in the family Amphisphaeriaceae. It is a plant pathogen.

References 

Fungi described in 1895
Xylariales
Fungal plant pathogens and diseases